Yeung Uk Tsuen is the name of several villages in Hong Kong:
 Yeung Uk Tsuen, Tsuen Wan District, in Tsuen Wan District
 Yeung Uk Tsuen, Shap Pat Heung, in Shap Pat Heung, Yuen Long District
 Yeung Uk Tsuen, Wang Chau, in Wang Chau, Yuen Long District